I'm Too Sensitive for This Shit is the fourth extended play by American pop singer Hayley Kiyoko. Originally set to be released October 11, 2019 and later December 12, 2019, it was eventually released January 14, 2020 via Empire Distribution and Atlantic Records.

I'm Too Sensitive for This Shit came out single by single, being the EP's release date the same day as the last one was unveiled. It was preceded by the singles "I Wish", "Demons", "L.O.V.E. Me", "Runaway" and "She".

Track listing

Notes
 "I Wish" is an original composition from Jason Evigan that was previously used when producing the original demo for the unreleased song "I Wish" by Charli XCX. Therefore, in some instances, Charli XCX, Noonie Bao and Scott Harris are listed as uncredited writers.

References

External links
 
 

2020 EPs
Hayley Kiyoko EPs
Atlantic Records EPs
Empire Distribution EPs